The men's long jump at the 1998 European Athletics Championships was held at the Népstadion on 18 and 19 August.

Medalists

Results

Qualification
Qualification: Qualification Performance 8.05 (Q) or at least 12 best performers advance to the final.

Final

References

Results
Results
Results

Long Jump
Long jump at the European Athletics Championships